Church may refer to:

Religion
 Church (building), a building for Christian religious activities
 Church (congregation), a local congregation of a Christian denomination
 Church service, a formalized period of Christian communal worship
 Christian denomination, a Christian organization with distinct doctrine and practice
 Christian Church, either the collective body of all Christian believers, or early Christianity

Places

United Kingdom
 Church (Liverpool ward), a Liverpool City Council ward
 Church (Reading ward), a Reading Borough Council ward
 Church (Sefton ward), a Metropolitan Borough of Sefton ward
 Church, Lancashire, England

United States
 Church, Iowa, an unincorporated community
 Church Lake, a lake in Minnesota

Arts, entertainment, and media
 Church magazine, a pastoral theology magazine published by the National Pastoral Life Center

Fictional entities
 Church (Red vs. Blue), a fictional character in the video web series Red vs. Blue
 Church, a cat in Stephen King's novel Pet Sematary
 Church, a meeting of SOA members in the FX television series Sons of Anarchy

Films
 The Church (1989 film), an Italian horror film directed by Michele Soavi
 The Church (2018 film), an American horror film directed by Dom Franklin

Music

Groups
 Chvrches, an electropop trio from Glasgow, Scotland
 The Church (band), an Australian psychedelic rock band formed in Sydney in 1980

Albums
 Church (album), a 2020 album by Swedish electronic dance music duo Galantis
 The Church (Mr. Oizo album), a 2014 album by French electronic musician Mr. Oizo
 The Church (The Church album), originally released in 1981 as Of Skins and Heart
 Churches (album), a 2021 album by American singer-songwriter LP

Songs
 "Church" (Alison Wonderland song)
 "Church" (Coldplay song)
 "Church" (T-Pain song)
 "Church", a song by Aly & AJ from Sanctuary
 "Church", a song by Galactic from Coolin' Off
 "Church", a song by Fall Out Boy from Mania
 "Church", a song by OutKast from Speakerboxxx/The Love Below
 "Church", a 2021 song from Tina Arena
 "The Church", a song by Hawkwind from Church of Hawkwind

Other uses
 Church (programming language), a LISP-like probabilistic programming language
 Church (surname), including a list of people
 Church Line, San Francisco, California

See also
 Church station (disambiguation)
 Church's (disambiguation)
 Churching (disambiguation)